Sheikh Saeed bin Maktoum bin Rashid Al Maktoum (born 1 October 1976) is a member of the ruling family of Dubai, equestrian, businessman and a former Olympian sport shooter.

He owns international award-winning horses and a UAE football club. Sheikh Saeed is the son of Maktoum bin Rashid Al Maktoum, former Emir (Ruler) of Dubai, his uncle is the incumbent Emir of Dubai, Vice President and Prime Minister of UAE, Mohammed bin Rashid Al Maktoum.

Sport shooting career
He represented UAE in 2000, 2004, 2008 and 2012 Olympics in skeet shooting. He also competed at 2006 Asian Games and 2007 Pan Arab Games. Coached by Lithuanian shooter Leonas Molotokas

In 2006, he won Asian Shooting Championships in skeet.

In 2010, he won 9th Arab Shooting Championship at the Fahad Al Ahmed Complex in Kuwait.

In 2011, he won gold in the ISSF World Cup Finals in Al Ain, UAE. He also won gold in the 2011 Pan-Arab Games in Doha, Qatar.

Other sports
He is owner of famous racehorses including Lammtara of the Godolphin Stables.

He sponsored 1000 Dunes Rally in 2008.

Controversy

The sheikh married Azerbaijani former gymnast Zeynab Javadli in 2015. They divorced in 2019, setting off a custody battle over their children. The custody battle drew international headlines in 2022, when Javadli's lawyers asked the United Nations Human Rights Council for help, as she feared for the safety of herself and her children. According to the request, she had faced abuse, harassment, and intimidation from Emirati authorities, who also alleged that she is an unfit mother.

References

Emirati billionaires
Emirati racehorse owners and breeders
Maktoum family
Owners of Epsom Derby winners
Emirati male sport shooters
Olympic shooters of the United Arab Emirates
People from Dubai
Living people
1976 births
Shooters at the 2000 Summer Olympics
Shooters at the 2004 Summer Olympics
Shooters at the 2008 Summer Olympics
Shooters at the 2012 Summer Olympics
Shooters at the 2016 Summer Olympics
Asian Games medalists in shooting
Shooters at the 1998 Asian Games
Shooters at the 2002 Asian Games
Shooters at the 2006 Asian Games
Shooters at the 2010 Asian Games
Owners of Prix de l'Arc de Triomphe winners
Asian Games silver medalists for the United Arab Emirates
Medalists at the 2006 Asian Games